Linden Township is a township in Christian County, in the U.S. state of Missouri.

Linden Township was named for the town of Linden, one of the earliest settlements in the county.

References

Townships in Missouri
Townships in Christian County, Missouri